The Machine God Laughs is an anthology of three science fiction short stories edited anonymously by William L. Crawford.  It was published by Griffin Publishing Company during 1949 in an edition of 1,200 copies.  The stories were published originally in the magazine Fantasy Book.

Contents
"The Machine-God Laughs", by Festus Pragnell
"Star of the Undead", by Paul Dennis Lavond (pseudonym for Robert A. W. Lowndes, Frederik Pohl & Joseph Harold Dockweiler)
"Crusader", by Basil Wells

References

1949 anthologies
Science fiction anthologies